Fritz Kirmse (born 11 February 1912) was a German violinist and university lecturer. From 1934 to 1936 he was appointed to the Bayreuth Festival orchestra.

Life 
Kirmse was born in Leipzig in 1912. He first received violin lessons from Emil Kolb and then studied with Walther Davisson and Charles Münch at the University of Music and Theatre Leipzig. Already during his studies he took part in the Gewandhaus concerts.

In August 1933, Kirmse was engaged with the 1st violins in the Niedersächsisches Staatsorchester Hannover. Die Musik in Hannover. Die musikalischen Strömungen in Niedersachsen vom Mittelalter bis zur Gegenwart unter besonderer Berücksichtigung der Musikgeschichte der Landeshauptstadt Hannover" (The music in Hannover. The musical trends in Lower Saxony from the Middle Ages to the present day with special emphasis on the musical history of the state capital of Hanover). Published on the occasion of the 325th anniversary of the Opera House Orchestra by the Society of Friends of the Opera House Orchestra, Sponholtz, Hanover 1961, . From 1934 to 1936 he was additionally appointed to the Bayreuth Festival orchestra: The Bayreuth Festival Orchestra. History, stories and anecdotes from then to now. Lienau, Berlin 1997, . He received the honorary title of chamber musician in June 1937. From July 1937 he worked as 1st concertmaster in the orchestra of the Halle Opera House. From 1947 to 1958 he changed back to the Leipzig Radio Symphony Orchestra. After that he worked under Erich Donnerhack at the State Entertainment Orchestra Halle.

In 1938/39, Kirmse was primarius of the string quartet of the city orchestra of Halle.(Quellenkataloge zur Musikgeschichte. Vol. 40). Noetzel, Wilhelmshaven 2007, . After 1945 he was the first violinist of the Kirmse Quartet. From 1949 he was also a member of the Leipzig Beethoven Piano Trio.

In addition, he was a teacher at the Staatliche Hochschule für Musik Leipzig from 1946 to 1948. Among his students was the Gewandhaus musician Rolf Harzer.

Discography 
 Gian Francesco Malipiero: Violin Concerto (Urania Records 1954) – recording with Rolf Kleinert and the MDR Leipzig Radio Symphony Orchestra
 Johannes Brahms: Double Concerto (issued by Tahra) – recording of 1950 with Bernhard Günther, Hermann Abendroth and the Leipzig Radio Symphony Orchestra

Further reading 
 Hans-Rainer Jung: Das Gewandhaus-Orchester. Seine Mitglieder und seine Geschichte seit 1743. Faber & Faber, Leipzig 2006, .
 Heinrich Sievers: Die Musik in Hannover. Die musikalischen Strömungen in Niedersachsen vom Mittelalter bis zur Gegenwart unter besonderer Berücksichtigung der Musikgeschichte der Landeshauptstadt Hannover. Published on the occasion of the 325th anniversary of the Opera House Orchestra by the Society of Friends of the Opera House Orchestra, Sponholtz, Hannover 1961, .

References

External links 

 
 Fritz Kirmse in the MusicSack-Datenbank

1912 births
Possibly living people
Musicians from Leipzig
Concertmasters
German classical violinists
Male classical violinists
Academic staff of the University of Music and Theatre Leipzig